Marsha Kramer (June 19, 1945 – January 23, 2020) was an American theater and television actress. She made television appearances in The Waltons, Touched by an Angel, Frasier, NCIS, Dr. Ken, Eagleheart, Days of Our Lives, Out of Order, Malcolm in the Middle, and Modern Family.

Filmography

Film

Television

References

External links
 

1945 births
2020 deaths
Actresses from Chicago
University of California, Los Angeles alumni
Alumni of RADA
American television actresses
20th-century American actresses
21st-century American actresses